Company Man is a 2000 comedy film written and directed by Peter Askin and Douglas McGrath. The film stars McGrath, Sigourney Weaver, John Turturro, Ryan Phillippe, Alan Cumming, Anthony LaPaglia, Woody Allen, and Denis Leary as "Officer Fry". Bill Murray had a cameo appearance in the film that was cut before the film's release.

Plot
In the 1960s, Alan Quimp is a schoolteacher of English grammar and married to the very demanding Daisy Quimp. In order to avoid the constant mockery in Daisy's family, Alan says that he is a secret CIA agent. Daisy tells everybody, the CIA acknowledges the lie, but due to a coincidence, Alan has just helped and hidden the professional Russian dancer Petrov  who wanted to leave Russia. The CIA decides to hire Alan as an agent, to get the credit for bringing Petrov to the USA, and immediately decides to send him to a very calm place, Cuba.

Cast
 Alan Cumming as General Batista
 Anthony LaPaglia as Fidel Castro
 Denis Leary as Officer Fry
 Douglas McGrath as Alan Quimp
 John Turturro as Crocker Johnson
 Sigourney Weaver as Daisy Quimp
 Ryan Phillippe as Rudolph Petrov
 Jeffrey Jones as Senator Biggs
 Paul Guilfoyle as Officer Hickle
 Heather Matarazzo as Nora
 Meredith Patterson as Marilyn Monroe
 Tuck Milligan as President Kennedy
 Woody Allen (uncredited) as Lowther
 Jason Antoon (uncredited) as Croupier
 Bill Murray (cameo, deleted scene)
 Edward Priest as Company Man

Reception
The film grossed $146,193 on a $16 million budget.

Rotten Tomatoes reports that 14% of 63 surveyed critics gave the film a positive review; the average rating was 3.4/10. The consensus states: "A flat and misconceived movie with big stars."  On Metacritic, the film has an 18/100 rating, indicating "overwhelming dislike".  Lisa Nesselson of Variety called it "consistently silly, occasionally funny but mostly forced".

References

External links
 
 
 
 
 

2000 films
English-language French films
French spy comedy films
British spy comedy films
Cold War spy films
Films set in the 1960s
Films set in Cuba
Films shot in New York City
Films directed by Peter Askin
2000s spy comedy films
Films about the Central Intelligence Agency
Films with screenplays by Douglas McGrath
Films directed by Douglas McGrath
American spy comedy films
2000 comedy films
2000s English-language films
2000s American films
2000s British films
2000s French films